Good Night Malvinas (Buenas noches Malvinas) is an Argentine documentary film about the Falklands War, directed by Ana Fraile and Lucas Scavino. It premiered on December 31, 2020.

Synopsis 
In April 1982, Dalmiro Bustos and Elena Noseda face one of the most difficult moments of their lives when their eldest son, Fabián, is sent to fight in the Malvinas Islands along with hundreds of conscript soldiers. Almost 40 years after the events, Dalmiro, Elena and their two youngest children, Javier and María Elena, tell what they could not say then, in an attempt to follow in Fabián's footsteps and put into words the anguish and pain that they still remain.

Interviewees 
People interviewed for the film:
 Dalmiro Busts
 Elena Noseda
 Javier Bustos
 Maria Elena Bustos
 Raphael Spregelburd (rapporteur)

Comments 
José Luis Visconti on the site 'hárselacritica' wrote:
Leandro Arteaga in Página 12 opined:

References

External Links 
 Information on Goodnight Malvinas on the national cinema website

Argentine documentary films